Arno Wyzniewski (9 October 1938 - 14 September 1997) was an East German actor. He appeared in more than one hundred films from 1959 to 1997.

Selected filmography

References

External links 

1938 births
1997 deaths
Male actors from Berlin
German male film actors
Recipients of the National Prize of East Germany
East German actors